Sudal is a village and Village Development Committee in Bhaktapur District in the Bagmati Zone of central Nepal. At the time of the 1991 Nepal census it had a population of 6,074 with 1,081 houses in it.

References

Populated places in Bhaktapur District